Afzaal Ahmed (25 December 1948 – 23 April 2015) was a Pakistani cricketer and umpire. He stood in one ODI game in 1994.

See also
 List of One Day International cricket umpires

References

External links

1948 births
2015 deaths
Pakistani One Day International cricket umpires
Cricketers from Karachi
Pakistani cricketers
Karachi University cricketers
Karachi Blues cricketers
Public Works Department cricketers
Karachi cricketers
Sindh cricketers
National Bank of Pakistan cricketers
Karachi A cricketers
South Zone (Pakistan) cricketers